The Betrayers is the tenth novel in the Matt Helm spy series by Donald Hamilton, which originated with Death of a Citizen in 1960. This novel was first published in 1966. It was reissued in 2014 by Titan Books.

Up to this point, Hamilton had maintained a publishing schedule of at least one Helm novel annually, sometimes more than one. Readers would have to wait until 1968 until the release of the next Matt Helm novel, The Menacers.

Plot summary
During a holiday in Hawaii, Helm finds himself facing an old enemy who plans to accelerate the Vietnam War into a worldwide conflict.

References

External links
Synopsis and summary

1966 American novels
Matt Helm novels
Novels set in Hawaii
Novels set during the Vietnam War